Budakalász is a town in Pest county, Budapest metropolitan area, Hungary. Residents are Magyars, with a minority of Serbs.

The town includes within its boundaries the island of Lupa, situated on the Danube.

Twin towns – sister cities

Budakalász is twinned with:
 Ada, Serbia
 Kahl am Main, Germany 
 Lueta, Romania

References

External links

  in Hungarian

Populated places in Pest County
Budapest metropolitan area
Serb communities in Hungary